The Falcon F7 is sports car manufactured by Falcon Motorsports.

Overview
The design process of the supercar according to the concept of American designer Jeff Lemke began in 2009, in parallel with the founding of Falcon Motorsports. The premiere of the vehicle was preceded by the debut of the pre-production prototype at the North American International Auto Show, and finally the production model, the F7, was presented at the same exhibition two years later.

Visually, the Falcon F7 was distinguished by an aggressively styled silhouette with a low-set front apron decorated with two wide air inlets and narrow, upturned headlights. The two-door, two-seater body was equipped with the function of a removable roof on the section from the glass to the seats.

The F7 was powered by a 7.0 L LS7 V8 engine, which had a capacity of 7 liters and a power of 629 HP, transferring power to the rear axle in cooperation with a 6-speed manual transmission.

Production
The FF7 was a limited production car, the manufacturer of which decided to produce in a strictly limited series limited to 7 copies, after its premiere in 2012 systematically left the Michigan plants. At the time of its release, the price of this supercar was US$ 225,000.

References

Rear mid-engine, rear-wheel-drive vehicles
Sports cars
Coupés
Cars introduced in 2012